2 Hip 4 TV (stylized as 2HIP4TV) is an American variety show aimed at children that appeared on NBC in 1988 and was hosted by Colin Quinn and Ahmet Zappa. Musical guests included the Red Hot Chili Peppers, Edie Brickell and New Bohemians, Sparks and El Vez ("the Mexican Elvis").  The series was set in a bowling alley. It played on Saturday mornings.

References

External links

1988 American television series debuts
1988 American television series endings
1980s American children's comedy television series
NBC original programming
Television series by Saban Entertainment